A pentagon is a five-sided polygon.

Pentagon or the Pentagon may also refer to:

Places

United States
 The Pentagon, the headquarters of the United States Department of Defense in Arlington County, Virginia, US
 United States Department of Defense, as a metonym
 Pentagon station, a Washington Metro station
 Sanford Pentagon, an indoor sports arena in Sioux Falls, South Dakota

Elsewhere
 Pentagon (Brussels), the historical city centre of Brussels, delimited by the "small ring"
 Pentagon (Wiesbaden), the historical city centre of Wiesbaden, Germany
 Pentagon Shopping Centre, a shopping centre in Chatham, Kent, England
 Pentagon bus station, a defunct bus station located within the Pentagon Shopping Centre
 Pentagono del Buontalenti, in Livorno, Italy

Music
 Pentagon (Japanese band)
 Pentagon (South Korean band)
 The Pentagon (album), a 1976 album by pianist Cedar Walton

People
 Pentagón, a professional wrestling character in lucha libre
 Pentagón Jr. (born 1985), Mexican masked professional wrestler

Other uses
 Pentagon (computer), a Soviet clone of the ZX Spectrum computer

See also
 Bamboo Pentagon, a mythical secret headquarters of the Viet Cong
 Pentacon
 Pentaconn